Lenormand is a surname. Notable people with the surname include:

Henri-René Lenormand (1882–1951), French playwright
Louis-Sébastien Lenormand (1757–1837), French physicist, inventor and pioneer in parachuting
Marie Anne Lenormand (1772–1843), French professional fortune-teller for more than 40 years, famous during the Napoleonic era
Stéphane Lenormand, French politician

See also
 Lenormant, a surname
 Johann Kaspar Hechtel, who designed a deck of playing cards upon which Lenormand fortune-telling cards are modelled